Jacqueline Nannenberg is a Dutch Paralympic swimmer. She represented the Netherlands at the 1988 Summer Paralympics, at the 1992 Summer Paralympics and at the 1996 Summer Paralympics.

In total, she won three gold medals, one silver medal and one bronze medal. She won a gold medal on each occasion. In 1988, she also won a silver and a bronze medal.

References

External links 
 

Living people
Year of birth missing (living people)
Place of birth missing (living people)
Dutch female backstroke swimmers
Dutch female breaststroke swimmers
Dutch female butterfly swimmers
Dutch female freestyle swimmers
Dutch female medley swimmers
Swimmers at the 1988 Summer Paralympics
Swimmers at the 1992 Summer Paralympics
Swimmers at the 1996 Summer Paralympics
Medalists at the 1992 Summer Paralympics
Medalists at the 1996 Summer Paralympics
Paralympic gold medalists for the Netherlands
Paralympic silver medalists for the Netherlands
Paralympic bronze medalists for the Netherlands
Paralympic medalists in swimming
Paralympic swimmers of the Netherlands
S9-classified Paralympic swimmers
20th-century Dutch women